Laxmi Mall Singhvi (9 November 1931 – 6 October 2007) was an Indian jurist, parliamentarian, scholar, writer and diplomat. He was, after V. K. Krishna Menon, the second-longest-serving High Commissioner for India in the United Kingdom (1991–97). He was conferred with a Padma Bhushan in 1998.

Biography
Singhvi was born in Jodhpur, Rajasthan, India, into a Marwari Jain family. He had two brothers, Prasan Mall Singhvi and Gulab Mall Singhvi, and two sisters, Pushpa Sett and Chandra Bhandari. Singhvi was a gold medallist in BA from Allahabad University  and then did LLB & MA from Jaipur University. He was Rajasthan's first Rotary Scholar to Harvard University for his LLM. He then did his LL.D from Cornell University, USA in two years.

Legal career
After taking a degree in law, Singhvi began his legal practice at the Jodhpur trial and sessions courts. He practiced as an advocate for some time before contesting and winning the election to Parliament from the Jodhpur (Lok Sabha constituency) in 1962 as an Independent candidate (not affiliated to any political party). During his five-year term as MP, his appearances in court were necessarily limited by the demands of work in parliament and in his constituency. He subsequently returned to his law practice full-time, but abandoned his practice in the district court to begin practicing at the Rajasthan High Court and the Supreme Court of India. His practice soon flourished and he was named Advocate General of Rajasthan state for the period 1972–77. He was later designated a Senior Advocate in the Supreme Court of India.

Political career
During the decade of the 1950s, the Jawaharlal Nehru government vigorously pushed an agenda of "social modernization" of enacting laws based on "modern values," "progressive outlook" and "scientific temper" which enshrined Western perspectives and systems of marriage, divorce, inheritance and human relationships as the law which the courts of India would uphold. These vigorous efforts caused great disquiet among those educated sections of society who realized what was going on. However, the absence of an organized opposition party was an insuperable impediment to organized political resistance to this agenda. The Congress Party had the reputation and glamour of having secured the independence of India from Britain, and there was essentially no second political party in the electoral firmament.

Singhvi was drawn to politics as an opponent of this radical social agenda championed by Jawaharlal Nehru. Most of the radical legislation was passed during the term of the second Lok Sabha (1957–62). When elections for the third Lok Sabha were held in 1962, Singhvi stood for election as an independent candidate from his hometown, Jodhpur. Based on the goodwill his family enjoyed in Jodhpur, and on further goodwill and contacts created through his law practice, he won the election by a narrow margin and was elected to Parliament from the Jodhpur constituency.

As MP, he proposed the creation of an independent, statutory vigilance body with investigative powers, tasked with unearthing corruption in government. This proposal was based on his study of the role of the Ombudsman in Scandinavian countries. Singhvi served as a member of the Lok Sabha for five years, but lost the election of 1967 and did not return to Parliament until thirty-one years later.

In 1997, after he returned to India following a long tenure as High Commissioner to the UK, Singhvi formally joined the Bharatiya Janata Party. He was elected the following year to the Rajya Sabha for a term of six years (1998–2004). As MP, he served as Chairman of High Level Committee on Indian Diaspora. He was instrumental in implementing the Vajpayee government's outreach to the Indian diaspora. It was he who conceptualised the idea of holding and annual 'Pravasi Bharatiya Divas' event to promote interaction of NRIs with the Indian government and industry.

Diplomatic assignment
In 1991, Prime Minister PV Narasimha Rao appointed Singhvi High Commissioner to the Court of St. James. It is a measure of his reputation and professionalism that he remained in that office till 1997, undisturbed during the brief tenures of the next two Prime Ministers. This made him, after VK Krishna Menon, the second longest-serving High Commissioner for India in the United Kingdom (1991–97), a record the more remarkable for having overlapped with the terms of four Indian Prime Ministers.

In 1993, during his term as High Commissioner, Singhvi spearheaded the Indian delegation to the United Nations conference on Human Rights in Vienna. The same year, he was invited by the University of Cambridge to deliver the Rede Lecture, the topic being his own book, 'A Tale of Three Cities.'
 
He was also a member of the Permanent Court of Arbitration at The Hague.

Literary career
Singhvi wrote several books in both English and Hindi. These include A Tale of three cities, Jain Temples and Bharat aur Hamara Samay ("India and our times"). As a writer, he had a substantial output, and his numerous books are written in a style that can best be termed simple. They are a mix of general information on specific topics ("Jain temples") and of his views on various issues in books with a very general scope ("India and our times"). Singhvi had a lifelong interest in Jain history and culture, and was quite knowledgeable on the subject, especially with regard to the art and architecture of Jain temples. He served as president of the Indira Gandhi National Centre for the Arts.

Awards and recognition
In 1993, Dr Singhvi was awarded the Padma Bhushan by Govt. of India, and an honorary degree of LLD by the University of Buckingham.

The Supreme Court of India held the 'First Dr. L.M. Singhvi memorial lecture on 'Law, Technology and Society: Its dynamics’ on 17 January 2009, delivered by Dr. A.P.J. Abdul Kalam, Former President of India.

Using a bequest by the Trustees of the British Indian Golden Jubilee Banquet Fund, "Dr L M Singhvi Visiting Fellowship" is given out by University of Wales and 'Centre of South Asian Studies', University of Cambridge, for visiting student and scholars of Indian nationality.

The School of Constitutional Law at the National Law University, Jodhpur has been named after Dr. L.M Singhvi.

Personal life
Singhvi was married at a very young age to Kamla (née Baid), a lady of his own community and similar background, in a match arranged by their parents. His wife became a writer whose short stories were serialized in several Hindi-language magazines.

Their only son, Abhishek Manu Singhvi, is a leading lawyer, statesman and leader of the Congress Party. He is a member of Parliament in India from the Upper House, Rajya Sabha. LM Singhvi's daughter, Abhilasha Singhvi, is engaged in social work as Managing Trustee of Manav Seva Sannidhi, an NGO.

Singhvi died on 6 October 2007 in New Delhi following a brief illness.

Assessment
Overall, since his political and social views were not consonant with those of the dominant Congress party, Singhvi's political career remained stunted during the prolonged era when the socialist and secular views held sway over politics in an essentially unipolar political dispensation. During those four long decades of political marginalization, he never wavered from his foundational beliefs, but developed a flourishing legal career and a reputation for unimpeachable integrity. He lived to see the end of that era; his career ended on a high note when he was made a Rajya Sabha MP by a government which represented his own beliefs.

References

External links
Profile of M. L. Singhvi 
Obituary in The Times, 18 October 2007.

1931 births
2007 deaths
20th-century Indian lawyers
Writers from Rajasthan
Scholars from Rajasthan
Marwari people
Rajasthani people
People from Jodhpur
National School of Drama
High Commissioners of India to the United Kingdom
India MPs 1962–1967
Rajya Sabha members from Rajasthan
Recipients of the Padma Bhushan in public affairs
Members of the Permanent Court of Arbitration
Lok Sabha members from Rajasthan
Singhvi family
Bharatiya Janata Party politicians from Rajasthan
University of Allahabad alumni
Harvard Law School alumni
Cornell Law School alumni
Cornell University alumni
Indian judges of international courts and tribunals
Indian Jains
20th-century Jains